Robert Lennon (born 1993) is an Irish hurler who currently plays as a right corner-back for the Kilkenny senior team.

Born in Bennettsbridge, County Kilkenny, Lennon first played competitive hurling in his youth. He enjoyed All-Ireland successes at colleges level with St. Kieran's College. An All-Ireland medallist in the junior grade with Bennettsbridge, Lennon has also won one Leinster medal and one championship medal.

Lennon made his debut on the inter-county scene at the age of seventeen when he first linked up with the Kilkenny minor team. An All-Ireland winner in this grade as a substitute, he was later an All-Ireland runner-up with the under-21 team. Lennon made his senior debut during the 2015 league.

Honours

Team

St. Kieran's College
All-Ireland Colleges Senior Hurling Championship (2): 2010, 2011 (sub)
Leinster Colleges Senior Hurling Championship (2): 2010, 2011 (sub)

Bennettsbridge
All-Ireland Junior Club Hurling Championship (1): 2015 (c)
Leinster Junior Club Hurling Championship (1): 2014 (c)
Kilkenny Junior Hurling Championship (1): 2014 (c)

Kilkenny 
Leinster Senior Hurling Championship (1): 2015 (sub)
Leinster Under-21 Hurling Championship (1): 2012 (sub)
All-Ireland Minor Hurling Championship (1): 2010 (sub)
Leinster Minor Hurling Championship (1): 2010 (sub)

References

1993 births
Living people
Bennettsbridge hurlers
Kilkenny inter-county hurlers
Hurling backs